This is a list of troubadours in the Galician-Portuguese language (Galician-Portuguese lyric).

Castile
Lope Díaz de Haro
Rodrigo Díaz de los Cameros

Galicia
Airas Nunes
Bernal de Bonaval
Macías
Martim Soares
Martín Codax 
Mendinho
Paio Gomes Charinho
Paio Soares de Taveirós
Palla
Pêro Velho de Taveirós
Xohán de Requeixo

Portugal
Afonso Sanches
Aires Corpancho
Bernardo Bonaval
Denis of Portugal
João Soares de Paiva
João Lobeira
João Zorro
Nuno Fernandes Torneol

Galician-Portuguese